Yamandu Costa (born January 24, 1980, in Passo Fundo), sometimes spelled Yamandú, is a Brazilian guitarist and composer. His main instrument is the Brazilian seven-stringed classical guitar.

Costa began to study guitar at age seven with his father, Algacir Costa, leader of the group Os Fronteiriços (The Frontiersmen) and mastered the instrument after studying with Lúcio Yanel, an Argentine virtuoso who lived in Brazil. At age fifteen, Costa began to study southern Brazilian folk music, as well as the music of Argentina and Uruguay.

Influenced by the music of Radamés Gnattali, he began to study the music of other Brazilians, such as Baden Powell de Aquino, Tom Jobim and Raphael Rabello.

At age seventeen he played in São Paulo for the first time at the Cultural Circuit Bank of Brazil; the concert was produced by Study Tone Brazil.

Costa's diverse styles include chorinho, bossa nova, milonga, tango, samba and chamamé. 
Costa appeared in Mika Kaurismäki's 2005 documentary film Brasileirinho.

His album Vento Sul was considered one of the 25 best Brazilian albums of the second half of 2019 by the São Paulo Association of Art Critics.

In 2021, his album Toquinho e Yamandu Costa - Bachianinha (Live at Rio Montreux Jazz Festival) (with Toquinho) won the Latin Grammy Award for Best Instrumental Album.

Awards
 Prêmio Tim - Best Soloist - 2004
 Winner of the Prêmio Visa, Instrumental edition - 2001
 Trophy of Instrumental Music Revelation of the Rio Grande do Sul state
 25º Award of Best Instrumentalist of the Rio Grande do Sul state
 Winner of the Prêmio Califórnia of Uruguaiana - 1995

Discography
 2020 – Nashville 1996
 2019 - Vento Sul
 2018 – Yamandu Costa e Ricardo Herz
 2017 – Borghetti Yamandu
 2017 – Recanto
 2017 – Quebranto (with Alessandro Penezzi)
 2015 – Lado B  (with Dominguinhos)
 2015 – Tocata à Amizade
 2015 – Concerto de Fronteira (with Orquestra do Estado de Mato Grosso)
 2013 – Continente
 2011 – Yamandu Costa e Rogério Caetano
 2008 – Mafuá
 2007 – Lida
 2007 – Yamandu + Dominguinhos
 2007 – Ida e Volta
 2006 – Tokyo Session
 2005 – Música do Brasil Vol.I (DVD)
 2005 – Yamandu Costa ao Vivo (DVD)
 2005 – Brasileirinho
 2004 – El Negro Del Blanco (with Paulo Moura)
 2003 – Yamandu ao Vivo
 2001 – Yamandu / Prêmio Visa
 2000 – Dois Tempos (with Lúcio Yanel)

References

External links
Official website

Brazilian guitarists
Brazilian male guitarists
Seven-string guitarists
Brazilian composers
People from Rio Grande do Sul
1980 births
Living people
21st-century guitarists
21st-century male musicians
Latin Grammy Award winners
Latin music composers